Bastián Lorenzo Bodenhöfer Alexander (Santiago, July 1, 1961) is a Chilean actor, theater director, musician and cultural manager. He served as cultural attaché of the Chile embassy in France between 2000 and 2002, during the government of president Ricardo Lagos. Bodenhöfer established himself as a renowned actor in the telenovela Ángel Malo in 1986. During the 1990s, due to his physical attractiveness, his solid presence and his talent, he became the highest paid male lead in Televisión Nacional de Chile.

Personal life 
He is the son of the German-Chilean Jew composer Leni Alexander. He also studied in the Conservatoire de Paris where he developed as a saxophone and clarinet player. His brother, Andreas, is also a composer and his niece Miranda Bodenhöfer an actress and dancer. Bodenhofer was married to Consuelo Holzapfel (1983–1991) with whom he had two children; Damián Bodenhöfer and Maira Bodenhöfer, both actors. He also was married to Aline Küppenheim (2000–2006) and had a son called Ian Bodenhofer.

Filmography

TV shows

Telenovelas

TV series

References

1961 births
Chilean male television actors
Chilean male film actors
Chilean people of German-Jewish descent
Chilean Jews
Living people
Male actors from Santiago
20th-century Chilean male actors
21st-century Chilean male actors
Cultural attachés